Alexander Petrovich Kotsubinsky is a prominent Russian psychiatrist, a spokesman of St. Petersburg psychiatric school.

Education and career

Alexander Kotsubinsky graduated from Leningrad Pediatric Institute in 1964 and was in 1981 awarded the Candidate of Sciences degree for his dissertation The Peculiarities of Remissions in Faintly Progredient Schizophrenia (in Russian). He attained the M. D. degree in 2000. At present he is full professor in the Medical Academy of postgraduate education and head of the out-patient psychiatry department of the Bekhterev Psychoneurological Institute in St. Petersburg. His son  is a Russian journalist and historian.

Honours and awards
Medal of the Order of Merit for the Fatherland, the 2nd class

Selected publications 
 Коцюбинский А. П. Шизофрения: уязвимость — диатез — стресс — заболевание = [Schizophrenia: susceptibility - diathesis - stress - disease] / А. П. Коцюбинский, А. И. Скорик, И. О. Аксенова, Н. С. Шейнина, В. В. Зайцев, Т. А. Аристова, Г. В. Бурковский, Б. Г. Бутома, А. А. Чумаченко. Предисловие Н. Г. Незнанова. — СПб.: Гиппократ +, 2004. — 336 с. 
 Коцюбинский А. П. Социальная адаптация больных шизофренией с преобладанием дефицитарных расстройств / А. П. Коцюбинский, Е. Ф. Бажин // Шизофренический дефект (диагностика, патогенез, лечение). Под ред. Р. Я. Вовина. — СПб.: Минздрав РСФСР, ПНИ им. В. М. Бехтерева, 1991. — С. 155–168.
 Коцюбинский А. П. Место психотерапии в современных программах лечения и профилактики шизофрении / А. П. Коцюбинский, Н. С. Шейнина // XII съезд психиатров России (01—04.11.1995). — М., 1995. — С. 629–630.
 Коцюбинский А. П. Использование этологических принципов в психотерапии больных шизофренией / А. П. Коцюбинский, Н. С. Шейнина, Б. Г. Бутома // Шизофрения: Новые подходы к терапии: Сборник научных работ. — Харьков. — 1995. — Т. 2. — С. 129–230.
 Коцюбинский А. П. Об адаптации психически больных: (уточнение основных понятий) / А. П. Коцюбинский, Н. С. Шейнина // Обозр. психиатр. и мед. психол. им. В. М. Бехтерева. — 1996. — No. 2. — С. 203–212.
Коцюбинский А.П. Значение психосоциальных факторов в этиопатогенезе шизофрении и социальной адаптации больных: Дисс. ... докт. мед. наук. — СПб., 1999.

References

External links

Alexander Kotsubinsky’s profile at the Bekhterev Institute website 

Russian psychiatrists
Schizophrenia researchers
Academic journal editors
Living people
Year of birth missing (living people)